Cudgewa Football Netball Club, nicknamed the Blues, is an Australian rules football club which plays in the Upper Murray Football League. The club is based in Victorian town of Cudgewa and plays its home games at the Cudgewa Recreation Reserve. The club fields senior, reserve and junior sides as well as fielding all netball sides.

History
The Blues were among the founding members in 1893 of the Corryong Football Association, the competition which, after several name changes, became the Upper Murray Football League in 1937. The side finished second in its debut season and again in 1895 before claiming its first premiership in 1896. This inaugural flag was won on the basis of the number of premiership points attained during the home and away season, but by the time Cudgewa next went top, in 1904, the Association had introduced a finals system. The Blues won that year's grand final against Corryong, and by the time of the outbreak of world war one had added further such triumphs at the expense of Federal in 1911, Corryong in 1913, and Federal in 1914.

Between the wars Cudgewa claimed another four premierships but it was during the first four decades after world war two that the club really came into its own. Over the course of the forty-one season period from 1946 to 1986 the Blues contested no fewer than twenty-four senior grade grand finals, winning sixteen of them.

2000 and Beyond
Since the late 1990s Cudgewa has experienced mixed success under a variety of coaches starting by going back to back Premiers in 1999 and 2000. However, by the early 2000s the Blues were struggling with the retirement of several older players and the reformation of the Bullioh Football Club the Blues were drained of many of its better players. For the rest of the decade the Blues made the finals on only 4 occasions as they slowly rebuilt with some of the more promising players in the competition. By 2011 under new coach Bill Deery, and with a host of new recruits, the club made a resurgence to reach the Grand Final only to be defeated by Bullioh by 63 points in the decider.

See also
Upper Murray Football Netball League
Tallangatta & District Football League
Australian rules football in Victoria
Australian rules football in New South Wales

References

External links
 
 Club profile on AFL National

Netball teams in Victoria (Australia)
Australian rules football clubs in Victoria (Australia)
1893 establishments in Australia
Sports clubs established in 1893
Australian rules football clubs established in 1893
Multi-sport clubs in Australia